The Société Française de Construction Aéronautique (SFCA) was an aircraft manufacturing company based in Buc, France.<ref>Jean Liron, La SFCA – Avions Maillet-Taupin-Lignel, Aviation Magazine International no. 817-828, 1982</ref>

History
The Société Française de Construction Aéronautique'' was established on the 24 July 1934 by André Maillet. Most of the aircraft produced by SFCA were light aircraft and trainers.

Aircraft 
 SFCA Lignel 10
 SFCA Lignel 16
 SFCA Lignel 161
 SFCA Lignel 20
 SFCA Lignel 20S
 SFCA Lignel 31
 SFCA Lignel 44
 SFCA Lignel 46 Coach
 SFCA Maillet 20
 SFCA Maillet 201
 SFCA Maillet 21
 SFCA Maillet-Lignel 20
 SFCA Taupin
 SFCA Taupin 5/2

References

External links

Musee Aeronautique Presqu'ile Cote d'Amour

Yvelines
Defunct aircraft manufacturers of France